Bazimini or Bazmini is a small town on the island of Anjouan in the Comoros. According to the 1991 census the town had a population of 5,087. The current estimate for 2009 is 8,952 people

References

Populated places in Anjouan